Robert H. Boyson (June 9, 1893 – November 24, 1977) was an American farmer, businessman, and politician.

Born in Tustin, Waushara County, Wisconsin, Boyson served in the United States Army during World War I. He was a farmer and owned a general store and a saloon. He was a horse, cattle, and automobile dealer. Boyson served as sheriff and deputy sheriff for Waushara County for four years and was a Republican. Boyson served on the school board and was the board clerk. In 1941 and 1943, Boyson served in the Wisconsin State Assembly. Boyson died of a heart attack near Poy Sippi, Wisconsin on Thanksgiving Day while deer hunting.

Notes

External links

1893 births
1977 deaths
People from Waushara County, Wisconsin
Military personnel from Wisconsin
Businesspeople from Wisconsin
Farmers from Wisconsin
School board members in Wisconsin
Wisconsin sheriffs
Republican Party members of the Wisconsin State Assembly
20th-century American politicians
20th-century American businesspeople